Mandara is the name of the mountain that appears in the Samudra Manthana episode in the Hindu Puranas, where it was used as a churning rod to churn the ocean of milk. Shiva's serpent, Vasuki, offered to serve as the rope pulled on one side by a team of asuras, and on the other, by a team of devas. The Puranas refer to various sacred places on the hill that are also believed to be the abode of the avatar Krishna as Madhusudana or the destroyer of the demon called Madhu, who was killed by Krishna and then covered by the Mount Mandara.

Some legends identify Mandar Parvat, a hill in Banka district (near Bhagalpur district) in Bihar with Mount Mandara. The Mandar Parvat has the sculpture of what is believed to be of the demon Madhu. 

Kalidasa's Kumarasambhava refers to foot marks of Vishnu on the slopes of Mandara.  The hill is replete with relics of bygone ages.  Besides inscriptions and statues there are numerous rock cut sculptures depicting various Brahmanical images.  The hill is equally revered by the Jains who believe that their 12th Tirthankara Shri Vasupujya attained nirvana here on the summit of the hill. 

The depiction of the Churning of the Ocean of Milk became very popular in Khmer art, perhaps because their creation myth involved a Nāga ancestor. It is a popular motif in both Khmer and Thai art; one of the most dramatic depictions is one of the eight friezes that can be seen around the inner wall of Angkor Wat--the others being the Battle of Kurukshetra, Suryavarman's Military Review, scenes from Heaven and Hell, the battle between Vishnu and the asuras, the Battle between Krishna and Banasura, a battle between the gods and asuras, and the Battle of Lanka.

References
Dictionary of Hindu Lore and Legend by Anna Dallapiccola

Locations in Hindu mythology
Mythological mountains